Almaty Aviation was a cargo airline based in Almaty, Kazakhstan. Its base of operations is Almaty International Airport. The airline operates cargo services throughout Kazakhstan and the CIS.

Fleet
 3 Antonov An-12

References

External links

Defunct airlines of Kazakhstan
Airlines formerly banned in the European Union
Airlines established in 2002
Airlines disestablished in 2010